Ambeon Holdings PLC is a conglomerate holding company based in Sri Lanka. John Walker who established Walker Sons and Company is the founder of the company. In 1874, Walker founded Walker and Greig to supply agricultural machinery to plantations in the hill country. The company was incorporated in 1910 and in 1959, it was brought under Brown and Company. In 1970, the company was listed on the Colombo Stock Exchange.

When Lionhart Investment Limited acquired the company in 2007, operations under the new owners proved to be controversial. The Securities and Exchange Commission launched a probe into the company when a subsidiary of the company sold a platinum mine in South Africa at a profit. The directors of the company were fined for document falsification. Harsha de Silva accused the company and its parent of stock manipulation in the parliament in 2013. Taprobane Holdings, a consortium of Navitas Holdings, Galle Face Hotel Group and Hirdaramani Group, acquired the company in 2015. In 2018, the company was renamed Ambeon Holdings. Ambeon Holdings is one of the LMD 100 companies in Sri Lanka.  The company is also one of the top 20 conglomerates in the country. Ambeon Holdings controls a number of notable subsidiaries including Ceylon Leather Products, Dankotuwa Porcelain, MillenniumIT ESP, and Royal Fernwood Porcelain.

History

Colonial origin and post-independence Browns subsidiary
John Walker, a Scottish engineer who established Walker Sons and Company is the founder of the company. In 1874, Walker established Walker and Greig in Badulla and Haldumulla to supply agricultural machinery to the plantations in those areas. With the growing importance of Haputale, the Haldumulla shop was closed, and a new shop opened in Haputale. The headquarters of Walker and Greig was moved to Slave Island, Colombo later. The Colombo headquarters extended over five acres. The company was incorporated as a limited liability company in 1910. Walker and Greig Company was brought under Brown and Company in 1959. The company was listed on the Colombo Stock Exchange on 1 January 1970.

Lionhart acquisition and SEC probe
UK-based Lionhart Investments Limited acquired Walker and Greig in 2007 from Browns Group for LKR76 million. The company was renamed Environmental Resources Investment PLC in the following year. Environmental Resources Investment and Ceylon Leather Products acquired Dankotuwa Porcelain for LKR433 million in 2010. In the same year, the Securities and Exchange Commission launched a probe into Environmental Ressources Investments for stock manipulation. A platinum mine in South Africa bought by a subsidiary incorporated in the British Virgin Islands was the cause of the investigation.  Despite the company selling the platinum mine at a capital gain, the investigation continued by the Securities and Exchange Commission. The UNP parliamentarian Harsha de Silva accused Lionhart of pumping and dumping in the parliament in 2013. Each of the directors of the company was charged with an LKR3.3 million fine for document falsification and non-disclosure.

New ownership under Taprobane
The company's name was changed to Lanka Century Investments in November 2013. Taprobane Holdings PLC, a consortium of Navitas Holdings, Galle Face Hotel Group, and Hirdaramani Group took control of Lanka Century Investments in 2015. Lanka Century Investments acquired MillenniumIT ESP from the London Stock Exchange Group in 2017 for LKR1079.1 million. In June 2018, the company adopted its current name, Ambeon Holdings PLC, while its parent became Ambeon Capital PLC. Collectively they are called the Ambeon Group.

Operations
Ambeon Holdings and its parent Ambeon Capital both are LMD 100 companies. LMD 100 ranks Sri Lankan listed companies by revenue annually. Ambeon Capital and Ambeon Holdings are ranked 52nd and 53rd in its 2020/21 edition published in 2022. Ambeon Holdings is one of the top 20 conglomerates in Sri Lanka by brand value. Brand Finance calculates the brand value of Ambeon Holdings to be worth LKR3,224 million in 2019. Ambeon Holdings sold its subsidiary South Asia Textiles to Hayleys Fabrics PLC for LKR4 billion in 2021. Ambeon Holdings acquired South Asia Texttiles in 2011.

Finances

Source: Annual Report, 2021/22 (p. 143)

Subsidiaries

Source: Annual Report, 2021/22 (pp. 99–100)

See also
 List of companies listed on the Colombo Stock Exchange

References

External links
 Official website

1910 establishments in Ceylon
Conglomerate companies established in 1910
Companies listed on the Colombo Stock Exchange
Conglomerate companies of Sri Lanka
Holding companies of Sri Lanka